There are two places in County Durham, England called Mount Pleasant:

 Mount Pleasant, Spennymoor
 Mount Pleasant, Stockton-on-Tees